The 2007 VMI Keydets football team represented the Virginia Military Institute during the 2007 NCAA Division I FCS football season. It was the Keydets' 117th year of football, and their 5th season in the Big South Conference.

The Keydets finished the season with a 2–9 record, one more win than the previous season. It was the last year under head coach Jim Reid, who resigned after season's end with a 3–19 record at VMI.

Schedule

References

VMI
VMI Keydets football seasons
VMI Keydets football